Tsarukyan Alliance (Tsarukyan Dashink) was a liberal political alliance of three political parties in Armenia: Prosperous Armenia, Alliance Party and Mission Party. It was formed on 18 January 2017, before the 2017 Armenian parliamentary election. The leader of the alliance was famous businessman Gagik Tsarukyan.

History
On 2 April 2017, the alliance participated in the Armenian parliamentary election and won 31 seats out of 105 in the National Assembly. The Armenian National Movement Party announced its support to the alliance, while the Solidarity Party endorsed the alliance.

The alliance was officially dissolved prior to the 2018 Armenian parliamentary election.

Composition

Electoral record

Parliamentary elections

See also
 Programs of political parties in Armenia

References

2017 establishments in Armenia
Defunct political party alliances in Armenia
Political parties established in 2017
Liberal parties in Armenia